The Pirbright Institute (formerly the Institute for Animal Health) is a research institute in Surrey, England, dedicated to the study of infectious diseases of farm animals. It forms part of the UK government's Biotechnology and Biological Sciences Research Council (BBSRC). The institute employs scientists, vets, PhD students and operations staff.

History
It began in 1914 to test cows for tuberculosis. More buildings were added in 1925. Compton was established by the Agricultural Research Council in 1937. Pirbright became a research institute in 1939 and Compton in 1942. The Houghton Poultry Research Station at Houghton, Cambridgeshire was established in 1948. In 1963 Pirbright became the Animal Virus Research Institute and Compton became the Institute for Research on Animal Diseases. The Neuropathogenesis Unit (NPU) was established in Edinburgh in 1981. This became part of the Roslin Institute in 2007.

In 1987, Compton, Houghton and Pirbright became the Institute for Animal Health, being funded by BBSRC. Houghton closed in 1992, operations at Compton are being rapidly wound down with the site due to close in 2015.

The Edward Jenner Institute for Vaccine Research was sited at Compton until October 2005.

Significant investment (over £170 million) is taking place at Pirbright with the development of new world-class laboratory and animal facilities. The institute has been known as "The Pirbright Institute" since October 2012.

On 14 June 2019 the largest stock of the rinderpest virus was destroyed at the Pirbright Institute.

Directors of note

 Dr John Burns Brooksby 1964 until 1980

Structure
The work previously carried out at Compton has either moved out to the university sector, ended or has been transferred to the Pirbright site. The Compton site currently carries out work on endemic (commonplace) animal diseases including some avian viruses and a small amount of bovine immunology whilst Pirbright works on exotic (unusual) animal diseases (usually caused by virus outbreaks). Pirbright has national and international reference laboratories of diseases. It is a biosafety level 4 laboratories (commonly referred to as "P4" or BSL-4).

Funding
25% of its income comes from a core grant from the BBSRC of around £11m.  Around 50% comes from research grants from related government organisations, such as DEFRA, or industry and charities (such as the Wellcome Trust). The remaining 25% comes from direct payments for work carried out.

The Bill & Melinda Gates Foundation has provided funding to the institute for research into veterinary infectious diseases and universal flu vaccine development.

Function
The Pirbright Institute carries out research, diagnostics and surveillance viruses carried by animals, such as foot-and-mouth disease virus (FMDV), African swine fever, bluetongue, lumpy skin disease and avian and swine flu  farm animals.  Understanding of viruses comes from molecular biology.

It carries out surveillance activities on farm animal health and disease movement in the UK.

Services 

 Arthropod supplies
 Diagnostics & Surveillance
 Disinfectant testing
 Flow cytometry & cell sorting
 Products - Includes positive sera, inactived antigens, diagnostic kits, viral cultures and live midges.
 Training courses

Location 
The institute had two sites at:
 Compton in Berkshire – closed in early 2016 and services relocated to Pirbright where new facilities had been constructed.
 Pirbright in Surrey – shared with commercial company Merial

See also
 2007 United Kingdom foot-and-mouth outbreak
 World Organisation for Animal Health
 Bluetongue disease
 Veterinary Laboratories Agency (now part of the Animal Health and Veterinary Laboratories Agency)
 Animal Health (now part of the Animal Health and Veterinary Laboratories Agency)
 Animal Health and Veterinary Laboratories Agency (an Executive Agency of the Department of Environment, Food and Rural Affairs)

References

External links
 

Agricultural research institutes in the United Kingdom
Agricultural organisations based in England
Animal health in England
Animal research institutes
Animal virology
Biotechnology in the United Kingdom
Biotechnology organizations
Genetics or genomics research institutions
Medical research institutes in the United Kingdom
Microbiology institutes
Research institutes established in 1987
Research institutes in Berkshire
Research institutes in Surrey
Veterinary research institutes
1987 establishments in England
Veterinary medicine in England